"Jump Right In" is a song recorded by The Urge and the third track from their 1998 album Master of Styles. It features vocals by 311 vocalist Nick Hexum. It is one of the band's most well-known songs and has been a live staple in every concert.

In popular culture
The song has been used in an episode of Daria entitled "Ill" and The Real World.

Chart performance
The song debuted at No. 38 on April 11, 1998, and peaked at No. 10 on the Billboard Modern Rock Tracks chart on July 4, 1998.

References

1998 songs
1998 singles
Songs written by Nick Hexum